The Thompson Falls Women's Club, which has also been known as the Rinard House, at 210 Jefferson St. in Thompson Falls in Sanders County, Montana, was listed on the National Register of Historic Places in 1986.

The building is significant for its association with the women's club which was founded in 1914.

It is a one-story wood-frame building with a log and stone exterior.  It was built in 1910 as a three-room house, and it was home for Leonard Rinard, an attorney who was County Clerk and Recorder, until he sold it in 1914.  It was acquired by the Women's Club in 1928.

The Woman's Club originally convened at the home of M.V. Brown, its president. It was reorganized in 1921 "as a non-sectarian and non-political organization, where women in Thompson Falls 'can come and discuss issues and measures with the purpose of benefitting every
man, woman and child in the community.'  Together with other organizations the club organized a child welfare clinic in 1922.  It helped organize a community bathhouse, a community swimming pool, and the Sanders County Historical Library.

References

National Register of Historic Places in Sanders County, Montana
Houses on the National Register of Historic Places in Montana
Women's club buildings
Women's clubs in the United States
Houses completed in 1910
Clubhouses on the National Register of Historic Places in Montana
History of women in Montana
1910 establishments in Montana
Log houses in the United States
Thompson Falls, Montana
Log buildings and structures on the National Register of Historic Places in Montana